Captain Brian Gilmore Young, DSO (25 September 1930 – 24 December 2009) was a British Royal Navy officer, naval aviator  and Falklands War veteran.

Naval career
He joined the Royal Navy in 1944 as a cadet, first at Eaton Hall, Chester, then at Dartmouth. He served as a midshipman and sub-lieutenant in the battleship , the light carrier  and the sloop .

Falklands War
Young was captain of the destroyer  and commander of the ships detached to recover South Georgia, known as Operation Paraquet.

References

1930 births
2009 deaths
Royal Navy officers
Falklands War in South Georgia
Royal Navy personnel of the Falklands War
Companions of the Distinguished Service Order